The 2019–20 Stony Brook Seawolves men's basketball team represented Stony Brook University in the 2019–20 NCAA Division I men's basketball season. They played their home games at the Island Federal Credit Union Arena in Stony Brook, New York and were led by first-year head coach Geno Ford, who took over for former head coach Jeff Boals, who left the school to accept the head coaching position at Ohio. They are members of the America East Conference. They finished the season 20–13, 10–6 in America East play to finish in second place. They defeated Albany in the quarterfinals of the America East tournament before losing in the semifinals to Hartford.

Previous season
The Seawolves finished the 2018–19 season 24–9 overall, 12–4 in conference play to finish in second place. In the America East tournament, they were upset in the quarterfinals by Binghamton. They were invited to the College Basketball Invitational, where they lost to South Florida in the first round.

Offseason

Departures

Incoming transfers 

Note: Policelli was deemed ineligible for the 2019–20 season due to NCAA transfer regulations.

2019 recruiting class

Roster

Schedule and results

|-
!colspan=12 style=| Non-conference regular season

|-
!colspan=9 style=| America East Conference regular season

|-
!colspan=12 style=| America East tournament
|-

|-

Source

See also 
2019–20 Stony Brook Seawolves women's basketball team

References

Stony Brook Seawolves men's basketball seasons
Stony Brook Seawolves
Stony Brook Seawolves men's basketball
Stony Brook Seawolves men's basketball